Amanda is a genus of sea slugs, specifically of aeolid nudibranchs. They are marine gastropod molluscs in the family Facelinidae.

Species
Species in this genus include:
 Amanda armata Macnae, 1954

References

External links
 Scudder, Samuel H. (1882). Nomenclator zoologicus. An alphabetical list of all generic names that have been employed by naturalists for recent and fossil animals from the earliest times to the close of the year 1879. Bulletin of the United States National Museum. 19: xix, [2 lists] 1-376 [supplemental to Agassiz], 1-340 [universal list]

Facelinidae